Leonard Alson Sawyer (May 18, 1925 – August 19, 2015) was a lawyer and politician in the American state of Washington. He represented the 25th district (Pierce County) as a Democrat initially elected in 1955, serving until 1975. He was Speaker of the House from 1973 to 1977. He was born in Puyallup, Washington and attended the University of Washington Law School. A veteran of World War II in the United States Navy, Sawyer was an attorney. On August 19, 2015, Sawyer died at the age of 90.

References

Speakers of the Washington House of Representatives
Democratic Party members of the Washington House of Representatives
1925 births
2015 deaths
Politicians from Puyallup, Washington
University of Washington School of Law alumni
Washington (state) lawyers
20th-century American lawyers
United States Navy personnel of World War II